Southwest is a compass point.

Southwest, south-west, south west, southwestern or south-western or south western may also refer to:
Southwest (direction), an intercardinal direction

Geography
South West Queensland, Australia
South West (Western Australia), one of the nine regions of Western Australia
Southwest National Park – a national park in Tasmania
Southwest Region (Cameroon)
Southwest China
South West Africa, a region controlled by Germany, and later, South Africa. Now the independent country of Namibia.
South-West Region, Ireland, a NUTS Level III region of Ireland and is governed by the South-West Regional Authority
South-Western Administrative Okrug, an administrative division of the federal city of Moscow, Russia
South West District, Singapore
South West England, a region including the counties of Gloucestershire, Wiltshire, Dorset, Somerset, Devon and Cornwall
South West England (European Parliament constituency)
South West (London sub region), a subregion of the London Plan
South West (London Assembly constituency), a constituency represented in the London Assembly
SW postcode area, for south-west London, England
Southwestern United States
Southwest, Indiana, an unincorporated community in the United States
Southwest Township, Warren County, Pennsylvania, United States
Southwest (Washington, D.C.), United States
South West (Nigeria)
South West State of Somalia, one of the six federal regions of Somalia
South West Ethiopia Peoples' Region, one of the eleven regional states in Ethiopia

Transport
 South West Trains, a former UK train operating company
 Southwest Airlines, the largest U.S. domestic airline, founded in 1967
 South Western Railway (train operating company), a current UK train operating company
 South Western Railway (disambiguation), various railway lines and companies

Former airlines
 Air Southwest (Canada), a Canadian airline operating from 1983 to 2005
 China Southwest Airlines, merged into Air China in 2002
 Pacific Southwest Airlines, founded in 1949 and merged into USAir in 1988
 Southwest Airways, a defunct post-World War II domestic United States regional airline
 Air Southwest, a British airline operating from 2003 to 2010

Former railroad routes
 A Chicago-Los Angeles train operated by Amtrak, and now known as the Southwest Chief
 Southwest Limited (MILW) formerly operated by the Chicago, Milwaukee, St. Paul and Pacific Railroad ("the Milwaukee Road") between Chicago/Milwaukee and Kansas City
 Southwestern Limited (IC train), an Illinois Central train, from Meridian, Mississippi to Shreveport, Louisiana, discontinued in 1967
 Southwestern Limited (New York Central train), a New York Central train, from New York, New York to St. Louis, Missouri, operating from 1889 to 1966

Sports
 Southwestern Athletic Conference, a mid-major college athletic conference in the southern United States
 Southwestern Conference (Ohio), a high school athletic conference
 Southwest Conference, a former NCAA college athletic conference
 Gatlin Brothers-Southwest Golf Classic, a former PGA Tour golf event
 Southwest Region (Little League World Series), a youth baseball competition in the United States, and the largest in the world
 South Western F.C., a 19th century association football team from Govan, Scotland

Other uses
 Southwestern Company, an American book publisher
 South-Western Educational Publishing, an American book publisher, now part of Cengage
 SouthWest Energy, an Ethiopian energy company
 Southwest (album), a collaboration album by Daz Dillinger and Nuwine
 Southwest (film), a 2012 Brazilian film

See also
 South West Island (disambiguation)
 Southwest, Western Australia, a list of governmental divisions in Western Australia
 Southwest Corridor (disambiguation)
 Southwest University (disambiguation)
 Southwestern University (disambiguation)
 Southwest Region School District (SWRSD), a school district headquartered in Dillingham, Alaska
 Sud-Ouest (disambiguation), French for southwest
 Sud-Vest (development region), a region in Romania
 Yugo-Zapad Municipal Okrug, a municipal okrug in Krasnoselsky District of Saint Petersburg